Southeast Main Street is a light rail station on the MAX Green Line in Portland, Oregon. It is the first stop southbound on the I-205 MAX branch, following the Green Line's split from the Red and Blue lines at the Gateway Transit Center.

The station is located at the intersection of SE 96th Avenue and Main Street. It is adjacent to Interstate 205, and is located near Mall 205, Adventist Medical Center, and surrounding businesses. This station has a center platform, and has a park-and-ride lot to the west of (and extending south from) the station.

Park-and-ride lot
The park-and-ride lot is connected to Main Street via a level crossing over the MAX tracks. It has 420 parking spaces, and is open all days.

Bus line connections
This station is served by the following bus lines:
15 – Belmont/NW 23rd

External links
Station information (with northbound ID number) from TriMet
Station information (with southbound ID number) from TriMet
MAX Light Rail Stations – more general TriMet page

MAX Light Rail stations
MAX Green Line
2009 establishments in Oregon
Railway stations in the United States opened in 2009
Railway stations in Portland, Oregon